Juniata Township is a township in Huntingdon County, Pennsylvania, United States. The population was 436 at the 2020 census.

Geography

Adjacent Municipalities
All municipalities are located in Huntingdon County unless otherwise noted.
Smithfield Township
Henderson Township
Union Township
Walker Township
Penn Township

Demographics

At the 2010 census there were 554 people and 235 households within the township.  The population density was 33.6 people per square mile (13.0/km).  There were 451 housing units at an average density of 21.3/sq mi (8.2/km).  The racial makeup of the township was 99.46% White, 0.18% African American, 0.18% Asian, and 0.18% from two or more races. Hispanic or Latino of any race were 0.18%.

There were 235 households, 26.0% had children under the age of 18 living with them, 67.0% were married couples living together, 3.6% had a female householder with no husband present, and 26.8% were non-families. 23.2% of households were made up of individuals, and 9.8% were one person aged 65 or older.  The average household size was 2.46 and the average family size was 2.87.

The age distribution was 18.4% under the age of 18, 2.2% from 18 to 19, 5.4% from 20 to 24, 6.9% from 25 to 34, 19.9% from 35 to 49, 25.3% from 50 to 64, and 22.0% 65 or older.  The median age was 40 years. The population was 49.10% male, and 50.90% female.

References

Townships in Huntingdon County, Pennsylvania
Townships in Pennsylvania